Niccolò  Casolani (1659-1714) was an Italian painter.

Biography

He was born in Venice, where he gained the nickname il Nicoletto. He was invited to Florence by the Granduke Ferdinand de' Medici, and he painted members of his family and the court. He painted a series of baccanals for his patron. He was invited to England where he painted a portrait of queen Anne.  He gained a stipend from the English court. He became an alcoholic and died in 1714.

Sources

1659 births
1714 deaths
17th-century Italian painters
Italian male painters
18th-century Italian painters
Painters from Venice
Painters from Florence
18th-century Italian male artists